Billy the Kid in Texas is a 1940 American Western film directed by Sam Newfield. It's the second in the "Billy the Kid" film series, produced by PRC from 1940 to 1946.

Plot
Billy the Kid runs into his old friend Fuzzy in a wide-open Texas town. When he stands up to town thug Flash and his gang, the grateful citizens make him sheriff. Now that he has legal authority, Billy and Fuzzy go after Flash, who has stolen a large amount of money and framed young Gil Cooper, a member of his  gang, for it—not knowing that Gil Cooper is actually Gil Bonney, Billy's brother.

Cast
 Bob Steele as Billy the Kid
 Al St. John as Fuzzy
 Terry Walker as Mary Barton
 Carleton Young as Gil Bonney / Gil Cooper
 Charles King as Dave
 John Merton as Flash
 Frank LaRue as Jim Morgan
 Slim Whitaker as Windy the Wagon Driver

See also
The "Billy the Kid" films starring Bob Steele:
 Billy the Kid Outlawed (1940)
 Billy the Kid in Texas (1940)
 Billy the Kid's Gun Justice (1940)
 Billy the Kid's Range War (1941)
 Billy the Kid's Fighting Pals (1941)
 Billy the Kid in Santa Fe (1941)

External links
 
 

1940 films
1940s Western (genre) comedy films
1940 comedy films
American Western (genre) comedy films
American black-and-white films
Billy the Kid (film series)
1940s English-language films
Films directed by Sam Newfield
1940s American films